Frank Rost (born 30 June 1973) is a German former professional footballer who played as a goalkeeper.

He comes from a sporting family background; his father Peter won a gold medal at the 1980 Olympic Games in handball, and his mother Christina, also a handball player, won the silver at the 1976 Summer Olympics and bronze at the 1980 Games.

Club career

Early career and Werder Bremen
Born in Karl-Marx-Stadt, Rost started his career at 1. FC Markkleeberg in the third German level.

His play with Markkleeberg led to interest from Werder Bremen who signed Rost in 1992. After playing with Werder Bremen II Rost made his Bundesliga debut during the 1995–96 season and became first-choice keeper during the 1998–99 season. At the end of this season he helped Bremen win the 1998–99 DFB-Pokal. The final against Bayern Munich went to penalties and Rost scored a penalty himself before saving from Lothar Matthäus to win Bremen the cup.

Rost was the second goalkeeper (after Jens Lehmann) to score from open play in the Bundesliga, when he scored on 31 March 2002 against Hansa Rostock. His goal was one of two goals Werder Bremen scored in the last minutes of the match to complete a comeback from a 3–1 deficit and win 4–3. At the end of the 2001–02 season the club finished in sixth place and qualified for the UEFA Cup.

Schalke 04

Rost moved to Schalke 04 in July 2002. He was a regular first-choice keeper at Schalke until he lost his starting position to youngster Manuel Neuer in late 2006.

Hamburger SV
In January 2007 Rost moved to then struggling Hamburger SV where he immediately became first-choice keeper and helped the team move from last to seventh place.

On 30 July 2009, Rost made his 100th international club appearance in a third round Europa League qualifier. Hamburg beat Danish side Randers FC 4–0. Rost is the German record holder for combined UEFA Cup and UEFA Europa League appearances and the player with the second-most appearances overall behind Giuseppe Bergomi having played 90 matches.

Ahead of the 2010–11 season, Rost competed with the newly signed Jaroslav Drobný for the spot as number one goalkeeper. His teammates gave him the nickname "Frost". He left Hamburger SV at the end of the season, hoping to move abroad or to become a coach.

During his time in the Bundesliga Rost appeared in 426 league matches.

New York Red Bulls and retirement
On 13 July 2011, German daily tabloid Bild reported that Rost would be joining New York Red Bulls in Major League Soccer. Red Bulls confirmed the signing that day. In the 2011 season with New York, Rost appeared in 11 regular season matches and posted five clean sheets. The club announced in January 2012 that it had been unable to agree terms with Rost and that he would not return for the 2012 season.

Rost announced his retirement on 19 February 2012.

International career
Rost was part of the East Germany national team at the 1989 FIFA U-16 World Championship, appearing in four matches. Rost earned a total of four caps with the German national team, making his debut against the United States in 2002.

Career statistics

Club

International

Honours
Werder Bremen
 Bundesliga: runner up 1994–95
 DFB-Pokal: 1993–94, 1998–99; runner-up 1999–2000
 DFB-Ligapokal: runner-up 1999
 UEFA Intertoto Cup: 1998

Schalke 04
 Bundesliga: runner up 2004–05
 DFB-Pokal: runner-up 2004–05
 DFB-Ligapokal: 2005; runner-up 2002
UEFA Intertoto Cup: 2003, 2004

Hamburger SV
 Emirates Cup: 2008, 2011

References

External links

  
 
 
 

1973 births
Living people
Sportspeople from Chemnitz
Association football goalkeepers
Expatriate soccer players in the United States
German footballers
Germany international footballers
German expatriate footballers
SV Werder Bremen players
SV Werder Bremen II players
FC Schalke 04 players
Hamburger SV players
New York Red Bulls players
Bundesliga players
Major League Soccer players
Designated Players (MLS)
German football managers
Footballers from Saxony
East German footballers
People from Bezirk Karl-Marx-Stadt
German expatriate sportspeople in the United States